Carla Mazzio, an American literary and cultural critic, specializes in early modern literature in relationship to the history of science, medicine, and health, the history of language, media technologies, and the printed book, and the history of speech pathologies with a focus on the harmful social construction of the “inarticulate” person or community. Her research has been supported by the Guggenheim Foundation, the National Endowment for the Humanities, and the Radcliffe Institute for Advanced Study at Harvard University.

Biography 
Carla Mazzio was born in Needham, Massachusetts. The youngest of four girls raised by Paula Collins Mazzio of Belmont, Massachusetts, she earned her B.A. from Barnard College and her Ph.D. in English from Harvard University. She has taught at the University of Michigan, Ann Arbor, the University of Chicago, the Bread Loaf School of English, and the University at Buffalo, State University of New York, and currently teaches at the University of California, Riverside.

Bibliography

Books
The Inarticulate Renaissance, Language Trouble in an Age of Eloquence (Philadelphia, University of Pennsylvania Press, 2009). 
Book Use, Book Theory: 1500-1700, author with Bradin Cormack (Chicago: University of Chicago Libraries, distributed by University of Chicago Press), 2005. 
Shakespeare & Science, editor, Special Double Issue of the Johns Hopkins Journal, South Central Review  (Winter and Spring, 2009).
Historicism, Psychoanalysis and Early Modern Culture,  editor with Douglas Trevor (New York: Routledge, 2000). 
The Body in Parts: Fantasies of Corporeality in Early Modern Europe, editor with David Hillman (New York: Routledge, 1997). 
Social Control and the Arts: An International Perspective, editor with Susan R. Suleiman, Alice Jardine and Ruth Perry (Cambridge: New Cambridge Press, 1990)

Selected essays 
“Circling the Square: Geometry, Masculinity and the Norms of Antony and Cleopatra,” Staging Normality in Shakespeare’s England, eds. Rory Loughnane & Edel Semple (Shakespeare Studies Series, London: Palgrave, 2019). 
"Scepticism and the Spectacular: On Shakespeare in an Age of Science," Spectacular Science, Technology and Superstition in the Age of Shakespeare," eds. Sophie Chiari and Mickael Popelard (Edinburgh University Press, 2017). 
*"Writing in the Aftermath: Digital Humanities, c. 1600?" in Numbers in Early Modern Writing, Special Issue of Journal of the Northern Renaissance, 6 (2015).
*"The Invisible Element in Art:  Dürer, Shakespeare, Donne," in Vision and its Instruments: Art, Science, and Technology in Early Modern Europe, ed. Alina Payne (Philadelphia: Penn State University Press, 2015).
*"Shakespeare and Science," Introduction, Shakespeare & Science, South Central Review 26.1 & 26.2 (Winter & Spring, 2009):  1-23.
"A History of Air: Hamlet and the Trouble with Instruments,"  Shakespeare & Science, South Central Review, Special Double Issue, 26.1 & 26.2 (Winter & Spring, 2009): 153-98.
"Anatomy of a Ghost: History as Hypothesis," Literature Compass 3.1 (January 2006): 17-31.  Invited Essay Response to "Shakespeare and Embodiment" in previous issue.
"The Senses Divided: Organs, Objects & Media in Early Modern England," Empire of the Senses: The Sensual Culture Reader, ed. David Howes (Oxford: Berg, 2005), 85-105.
"The Three-Dimensional Self: Geometry, Melancholy, Drama," Arts of Calculation, eds. David Glimp and Michelle R. Warren (NY: Palgrave, 2004), 39-65.
"Acting with Tact: Touch and Theater in the English Renaissance," Sensible Flesh: On Touch in Early Modern Culture, ed. Elizabeth Harvey (Univ. of Pennsylvania, 2003), 159-186. 
"The Melancholy of Print: Love’s Labour’s Lost," Historicism, Psychoanalysis, and Early Modern Culture (New York: Routledge, 2000), 186-227.
"Dreams of History," with Douglas Trevor, Introduction to Historicism, Psychoanalysis, and Early Modern Culture (2000).
"Staging the Vernacular: Language and Nation in Thomas Kyd’s The Spanish Tragedy," Studies in English Literature, 38 (Spring 1998) 2: 207-232.
"Individual Parts," with David Hillman, Introduction to The Body in Parts (1997).
"Sins of the Tongue," The Body in Parts (New York: Routledge, 1997), 53-79. 
Reprint: "Sins of the Tongue in Early Modern England" Modern Language Studies 28. 4 (Autumn 1998): 93-124.

Other
Script Editor, Underwater Dreams (2014 Documentary)

Awards 

John Simon Guggenheim Memorial Fellowship in the Humanities, 2014-2015.
Roland H. Bainton Book Prize for Literature for The Inarticulate Renaissance, 2010.
English Association Beatrice White Book Prize for The Body in Parts, 1999.
Hudson Strode Program in Renaissance Studies, selected as one of the top Renaissance Scholars in the world under 40,  2004.
National Endowment for the Humanities, 2004-2005.
Northeast Modern Language Association Graduate Caucus Essay Prize, 1996  
Helen Choate Bell Prize for Best Essay in American Literature, Harvard University, 1993.
Four Derek Bok Prizes for Excellence in Teaching at Harvard University, 1993-1997.

References

Year of birth missing (living people)
Living people
American literary critics
Women literary critics
Harvard University alumni
Barnard College alumni
University of Michigan faculty
People from Belmont, Massachusetts
University of Chicago faculty
University at Buffalo faculty
American women critics